New World is the second album by Do As Infinity, released 2001.

Track listing

Chart positions

External links
 New World at Avex Network
 New World at Oricon

2001 albums
Do As Infinity albums
Avex Group albums
Albums produced by Seiji Kameda